The Kur is a river in central Russia. It flows through the city of Kursk, where it falls into the Tuskar, which then falls into the Seym. The name relates to a dialect word kur'ya ("long and narrow river bay"), which itself may represent a borrowing from Komi kurya 'bay' (although it has been suggested that the latter is borrowed from Russian).

References

External links
 Kommersant.com description of Kursk Oblast
Tuskar River on Kursk Encyclopedia 

Rivers of Kursk Oblast